The 2004 United States presidential election in Ohio took place on November 2, 2004, and was part of the 2004 United States presidential election. Voters chose 20 representatives, or electors to the Electoral College, who voted for president and vice president.

Ohio was won by incumbent President George W. Bush by a 2.10% margin of victory. Prior to the election, most news organizations considered the Buckeye state as a swing state. The state's economic situation gave hope for John Kerry. In the end, the state became the deciding factor of the entire election. Kerry conceded the state, and the entire election, the morning following election night, as Bush won the state and its 20 electoral votes. The close contest was the subject of the documentary film ...So Goes the Nation, the title of which is a reference to Ohio's 2004 status as a crucial swing state. Had Kerry won the state, he would have won the presidency with 272 electoral votes despite losing the popular vote, the first Democrat to do so.

As of the 2020 presidential election, this is the last time Ohio voted more Democratic than the nation as a whole, as well as the last time Hamilton County voted for a Republican presidential candidate. This is also the last time that Ohio voted to the left of Colorado, Nevada or Virginia.

Ohio was 1 of 9 states to back George W. Bush twice that only backed George H. W. Bush once.

Primaries
 2004 Ohio Democratic presidential primary

Campaign

Predictions
There were 12 news organizations that made state-by-state predictions of the election. Here are their last predictions before election day.

Polling
Pre-election polling showed a lot of volatility throughout the general election. In September, Bush was gaining momentum here, reaching over 50% in several polls and even reaching double digit margins in some. But in October, Kerry gained back momentum as he started winning many of the polls, leading with from 48% to as high as 50%. The last 3 polls averaged Kerry leading 49% to 48%.

Fundraising
Bush raised $7,349,944. Kerry raised $3,428,504.

Advertising and visits
Both candidates campaigned heavily. Bush visited the state 18 times to Kerry's 23 times. Almost every week, over $10 million was spent on television advertising.

Analysis
CNN Exit polling showed that Bush barely won the state. Among male voters, he won with 52%. Among female voters, it was tied 50-50. Also, 53% of the voters approved of Bush's job as president.

Bush dominated in the rural areas, while Kerry dominated and won most of the counties with large populations. Overall, Bush won most of the counties and congressional districts in the state. All the congressional districts Kerry won were in the northern section of the state.

Results

Results by county

Counties that flipped from Democratic to Republican 
 Clark (largest municipality: Springfield)

Counties that flipped from Republican to Democratic
 Stark (largest municipality: Canton)

By congressional district
Bush won 13 of 18 congressional districts, including one held by a Democrat.

Electors

Technically the voters of Ohio cast their ballots for electors: representatives to the Electoral College. Ohio is allocated 20 electors because it has 18 congressional districts and 2 senators. All candidates who appear on the ballot or qualify to receive write-in votes must submit a list of 20 electors, who pledge to vote for their candidate and his or her running mate. Whoever wins the majority of votes in the state is awarded all 20 electoral votes. Their chosen electors then vote for president and vice president. Although electors are pledged to their candidate and running mate, they are not obligated to vote for them. An elector who votes for someone other than his or her candidate is known as a faithless elector.

The electors of each state and the District of Columbia met on December 13, 2004, to cast their votes for president and vice president. The Electoral College itself never meets as one body. Instead the electors from each state and the District of Columbia met in their respective capitols.

The following were the members of the Electoral College from the state. All 20 were pledged for Bush/Cheney.
 Spencer R. Raleigh
 Joyce M. Houck
 Betty Jo Sherman
 Gary C. Suhadolnik
 Randy Law
 Leslie J. Spaeth
 David Whipple Johnson
 Robert S. Frost
 Alex R. Arshinkoff
 Phil A. Bowman
 Jon Allison
 Katharina Hooper
 Pernel Jones
 Henry M. Butch O'Neill
 William O. Dewitt
 Karyle Mumper
 Owen V. Hall
 Merom Brachman
 Kirk Schuring
 Billie Jean Fiore

Objection to certification of Ohio's electoral votes 

On January 6, 2005, Senator Barbara Boxer joined Representative Stephanie Tubbs Jones of Ohio in filing a Congressional objection to the certification of Ohio's Electoral College votes due to alleged irregularities including disqualification of provisional ballots, alleged misallocation of voting machines, and disproportionately long waits in predominantly African-American communities. Ohio's polling locations and equipment are determined by two Democrats and two Republicans serving on the county's Board of Elections, which ensures that any decision made about polling resources is bipartisan.The Senate voted the objection down 74–1; the House voted the objection down 267–31. At the time, it was only the second Congressional objection to an entire State's electoral delegation in U.S. history; the first instance was in 1877, when all the electors from three southern states were challenged, and one from Oregon. The third instance was in 2021, when Republicans objected to the certification of the electors from Arizona and Pennsylvania. An objection to a single faithless elector was also filed in 1969.

See also
 United States presidential elections in Ohio
 Presidency of George W. Bush

References

 Ohio Election Results Spreadsheets

Ohio
2004
Presidential